Mathilde Puchberger (10 October 1911 – 1965) was an Austrian hurdler. She competed in the women's 80 metres hurdles at the 1936 Summer Olympics. Puchberger was a three-time national champion in the 4×100 relay event (1929, 1930 and 1931), and a six-time national champion in the 80 metres hurdles during the 1930s.

References

External links
 

1911 births
1965 deaths
Athletes (track and field) at the 1936 Summer Olympics
Austrian female hurdlers
Olympic athletes of Austria
Place of birth missing